is a private university located in Nagoya, Japan (名古屋市). Founded in 1887 by Dr. Frederick C. Klein, an American Methodist minister, as Aichi English School; the present-day university was established in 1964 with the Faculty of Economics. Nagoya Gakuin University follows the spirit of the school's motto “Fear God, Love People.”.

With a curriculum focusing on Business and Economics, as well as Foreign Studies and Human Health, Nagoya Gakuin University awards degrees at the bachelor's, master's, and Doctor of Philosophy levels.

Additionally, NGU has exchange agreements with universities around the world in 8 different countries: Australia, New Zealand, The Philippines, China, Taiwan, Thailand, The United States of America, Indonesia and Canada. Approximately 30 exchange students come to Nagoya Gakuin University every semester, and around 200 Japanese students participate in the university's study abroad programs each year.

Campus

Currently, the main campus is located near the Hibino subway station (日比野駅) in Atsuta-ku, Nagoya, Aichi Prefecture.

Adjacent to Shirotori Park (白鳥公園), and walking distance from Nagoya Congress Center (名古屋国際会議場), the Hibino campus houses dormitories, tennis courts, and an on-campus church. Exchange students coming from abroad to study at NGU also reside on-campus in the International Seminar House.

Prior to April 2007, the campus was located in Seto, perched upon a mountainside looking over the greater Nagoya region.

Geographically, Nagoya Gakuin University is located at

Student Activities
Nagoya Gakuin University has over fifty athletic, cultural and social organizations available for students to participate in. Additionally, martial arts such as Karate, Judo, Kendo and Shorinji Kempo are available.

Each autumn, NGU holds its annual school festival, featuring events and activities organized by both the Japanese and international students.

Departments

CIEP - Center for International Exchange Programs
IJS - Institute for Japanese Studies
Faculty of Commerce
Department of Commerce
Department of Information Business and Communication
Faculty of Economics
Department of Economics
Department of Policy Studies
Faculty of Foreign Studies
Department of English
Department of Chinese Communication
Department of International Culture and Cooperation
Faculty of Health and Sports
Department of Health Science
Department of Rehabilitation Science
Faculty of Law
Graduate School of Economics and Business Administration

External links
Nagoya Gakuin University Homepage in English

Nagoya Gakuin University
JASSO Description of NGU

Educational institutions established in 1887
Christian universities and colleges in Japan
Private universities and colleges in Japan
Universities and colleges in Nagoya
1887 establishments in Japan